This is a summary of the electoral history of Jacinda Ardern, Prime Minister of New Zealand (2017–2023), Leader of the Labour Party (2017–2023), a List MP (2008–17) and MP for Mount Albert (2017–present).

Parliamentary elections

2008 election

2011 election

2014 election

2017 by-election

2017 election

2020 election

Notes

References

Ardern, Jacinda
Jacinda Ardern